The Chinese Exclusion Act was a United States federal law signed by President Chester A. Arthur on May 6, 1882, prohibiting all immigration of Chinese laborers for 10 years. The law excluded merchants, teachers, students, travelers, and diplomats. The Chinese Exclusion Act was the first and only major U.S. law ever implemented to prevent all members of a specific national group from immigrating to the United States.

Passage of the law was preceded by growing anti-Chinese sentiment and anti-Chinese violence, as well as various policies targeting Chinese migrants. The act followed the Angell Treaty of 1880, a set of revisions to the U.S.–China Burlingame Treaty of 1868 that allowed the U.S. to suspend Chinese immigration. The act was initially intended to last for 10 years, but was renewed and strengthened in 1892 with the Geary Act and made permanent in 1902. These laws attempted to stop all Chinese immigration into the United States for ten years, with exceptions for diplomats, teachers, students, merchants, and travelers. They were widely evaded.

The law remained in force until the passage of the Magnuson Act in 1943, which repealed the exclusion and allowed 105 Chinese immigrants to enter the United States each year. Chinese immigration later increased with the passage of the Immigration and Nationality Act of 1952, which abolished direct racial barriers, and later by the Immigration and Nationality Act of 1965, which abolished the National Origins Formula.

Background

The first significant Chinese immigration to North America began with the California Gold Rush of 1848–1855 and it continued with subsequent large labor projects, such as the building of the first transcontinental railroad. During the early stages of the gold rush, when surface gold was plentiful, the Chinese were tolerated by white people, if not well received. However, as gold became harder to find and competition increased, animosity toward the Chinese and other foreigners increased. After being forcibly driven from mining by a mixture of state legislators and other miners (the Foreign Miner's Tax), the immigrant Chinese began to settle in enclaves in cities, mainly San Francisco, and took up low-wage labor, such as restaurant and laundry work. With the post-Civil War economy in decline by the 1870s, anti-Chinese animosity became politicized by labor leader Denis Kearney and his Workingman's Party as well as by California governor John Bigler, both of whom blamed Chinese "coolies" for depressed wage levels. Public opinion and law in California began to demonize Chinese workers and immigrants in any role, with the latter half of the 1800s seeing a series of ever more restrictive laws being placed on Chinese labor, behavior and even living conditions. While many of these legislative efforts were quickly overturned by the State Supreme Court, many more anti-Chinese laws continued to be passed in both California and nationally.

In the early 1850s, there was resistance to the idea of excluding Chinese migrant workers from immigration because they provided essential tax revenue which helped fill the fiscal gap of California. The Xianfeng Emperor, who ruled China at the time, was supportive of the exclusion, citing his concerns that Chinese immigration to America would lead to a loss of labor for China. But toward the end of the decade, the financial situation improved and subsequently, attempts to legislate Chinese exclusion became successful on the state level. In 1858, the California Legislature passed a law that made it illegal for any person "of the Chinese or Mongolian races" to enter the state; however, this law was struck down by an unpublished opinion of the State Supreme Court in 1862.

The Chinese immigrant workers provided cheap labor and did not use any of the government infrastructure (schools, hospitals, etc.) because the Chinese migrant population was predominantly made up of healthy male adults. In January 1868, the Senate ratified the Burlingame Treaty with China, allowing an unrestricted flow of Chinese into the country. As time passed and more and more Chinese migrants arrived in the United States and California in particular, violence would often break out in cities such as Los Angeles. The North Adams strike of 1870, broken by the replacement of all workers by 75 Chinese men was the trigger that sparked widespread working-class protest across the country, shaped legislative debate in Congress, and helped make Chinese immigration a sustained national issue.

Numerous strikes ensued, notably Beaver Falls Cutlery Company in Pennsylvania and others After the economy soured in the Panic of 1873, Chinese immigrants were blamed for depressing workmen's wages. At one point, Chinese men represented nearly a quarter of all wage-earning workers in California, and by 1878 Congress felt compelled to try to ban immigration from China in legislation that was later vetoed by President Rutherford B. Hayes. The title of the August 27, 1873, San Francisco Chronicle article, "The Chinese Invasion! They Are Coming, 900,000 Strong", was traced by The Atlantic as one of the roots of the 2019 anti-immigration "invasion" rhetoric.

In 1879, however, California adopted a new Constitution which explicitly authorized the state government to determine which individuals were allowed to reside in the state, and banned the Chinese from employment by corporations and state, county or municipal governments. Three years later, after China had agreed to treaty revisions, Congress tried again to exclude working class Chinese laborers; Senator John F. Miller of California introduced another Chinese Exclusion Act that blocked entry of Chinese laborers for a twenty-year period. The bill passed the Senate and House by overwhelming margins, but this as well was vetoed by President Chester A. Arthur, who concluded the 20-year ban to be a breach of the renegotiated treaty of 1880. That treaty allowed only a "reasonable" suspension of immigration. Eastern newspapers praised the veto, while it was condemned in the Western states. Congress was unable to override the veto, but passed a new bill reducing the immigration ban to ten years. The House of Representatives voted 201–37, with 51 abstentions, to pass the act. Although he still objected to this denial of entry to Chinese laborers, President Arthur acceded to the compromise measure, signing the Chinese Exclusion Act into law on May 6, 1882.

After the act was passed, most Chinese workers were faced with a dilemma: stay in the United States alone or return to China to reunite with their families. Although widespread dislike for the Chinese persisted well after the law itself was passed, of note is that some capitalists and entrepreneurs resisted their exclusion because they accepted lower wages.

Content
For the first time, federal law proscribed entry of an ethnic working group on the premise that it endangered the good order of certain localities. The earlier Page Act of 1875 had prohibited immigration of Asian forced laborers and sex workers, and the Naturalization Act of 1790 prohibited naturalization of non-white subjects. The Chinese Exclusion Act excluded Chinese laborers, meaning "skilled and unskilled laborers and Chinese employed in mining", from entering the country for ten years under penalty of imprisonment and deportation.

The Chinese Exclusion Act required the few non-laborers who sought entry to obtain certification from the Chinese government that they were qualified to emigrate. However, this group found it increasingly difficult to prove that they were not laborers because the 1882 Act defined excludables as "skilled and unskilled laborers and Chinese employed in mining". Thus very few Chinese could enter the country under the 1882 law. Diplomatic officials and other officers on business, along with their house servants, for the Chinese government were also allowed entry as long as they had the proper certification verifying their credentials.

The Chinese Exclusion Act also affected the Chinese who had already settled in the United States. Any Chinese who left the United States had to obtain certifications for reentry, and the act made Chinese immigrants permanent aliens by excluding them from U.S. citizenship. After the act's passage, Chinese men in the U.S. had little chance of ever reuniting with their wives, or of starting families in their new abodes.

Amendments made in 1884 tightened the provisions that allowed previous immigrants to leave and return and clarified that the law applied to ethnic Chinese regardless of their country of origin. The 1888 Scott Act expanded upon the Chinese Exclusion Act, prohibiting reentry into the U.S. after leaving. Only teachers, students, government officials, tourists, and merchants were exempt.

Constitutionality of the Chinese Exclusion Act and the Scott Act was upheld by the Supreme Court in Chae Chan Ping v. United States (1889); the Supreme Court declared that "the power of exclusion of foreigners [is] an incident of sovereignty belonging to the government of the United States as a part of those sovereign powers delegated by the constitution". The act was renewed for ten years by the 1892 Geary Act, and again with no terminal date in 1902. When the act was extended in 1902, it required "each Chinese resident to register and obtain a certificate of residence. Without a certificate, he or she faced deportation."

Between 1882 and 1905, about 10,000 Chinese appealed against negative immigration decisions to federal court, usually via a petition for habeas corpus. In most of these cases, the courts ruled in favor of the petitioner. Except in cases of bias or negligence, these petitions were barred by an act that passed Congress in 1894 and was upheld by the U.S. Supreme Court in U.S. vs Lem Moon Sing (1895). In United States v. Ju Toy (1905), the U.S. Supreme Court reaffirmed that the port inspectors and the Secretary of Commerce had final authority on who could be admitted. Ju Toy's petition was thus barred despite the fact that the district court found that he was an American citizen. The Supreme Court determined that refusing entry at a port does not require due process and is legally equivalent to refusing entry at a land crossing. All these developments, along with the extension of the act in 1902, triggered a boycott of U.S. goods in China between 1904 and 1906. There was one 1885 case in San Francisco, however, in which Treasury Department officials in Washington overturned a decision to deny entry to two Chinese students.

One of the critics of the Chinese Exclusion Act was the anti-slavery/anti-imperialist Republican senator George Frisbie Hoar of Massachusetts who described the act as "nothing less than the legalization of racial discrimination". 

The laws were driven largely by racial concerns; immigration of persons of other races was not yet limited. On the other hand, most people and unions strongly supported the Chinese Exclusion Act, including the American Federation of Labor and Knights of Labor, a labor union, who supported it because it believed that industrialists were using Chinese workers as a wedge to keep wages low. Among labor and leftist organizations, the Industrial Workers of the World were the sole exception to this pattern. The IWW openly opposed the Chinese Exclusion Act from its inception in 1905.

For all practical purposes, the Chinese Exclusion Act, along with the restrictions that followed it, froze the Chinese community in place in 1882. Limited immigration from China continued until the repeal of the act in 1943. From 1910 to 1940, the Angel Island Immigration Station on what is now Angel Island State Park in San Francisco Bay served as the processing center for most of the 56,113 Chinese immigrants who are recorded as immigrating or returning from China; upwards of 30% more who arrived there were returned to China. The Chinese population in the U.S. declined from approximately 105,000 in 1880, to 89,000 in 1900, and to 61,000 in 1920.

The act exempted merchants, and restaurant owners could apply for merchant visas beginning in 1915 after a federal court ruling. This led to the rapid growth of Chinese restaurants in the 1910s and 1920s as restaurant owners could leave and reenter along with family members from China.

Later, the Immigration Act of 1924 restricted immigration even further, excluding all classes of Chinese immigrants and extending restrictions to other Asian immigrant groups. Until these restrictions were relaxed in the middle of the twentieth century, Chinese immigrants were forced to live a life separated from their families, and to build ethnic enclaves in which they could survive on their own (Chinatown). The Chinese Exclusion Act did not address the problems that whites were facing; in fact, the Chinese were quickly and eagerly replaced by the Japanese, who assumed the role of the Chinese in society. Unlike the Chinese, some Japanese were even able to climb the rungs of society by setting up businesses or becoming truck farmers. However, the Japanese were later targeted in the act of 1924, which banned immigration from east Asia entirely.

In 1891, the Chinese government refused to accept U.S. senator Henry W. Blair as U.S. minister to China due to his abusive remarks regarding China during negotiations of the Chinese Exclusion Act.

The American Christian George F. Pentecost spoke out against Western imperialism in China, saying:I personally feel convinced that it would be a good thing for America if the embargo on Chinese immigration were removed. I think that the annual admission of 100,000 into this country would be a good thing for the country. And if the same thing were done in the Philippines those islands would be a veritable Garden of Eden in twenty-five years. The presence of Chinese workmen in this country would, in my opinion, do a very great deal toward solving our labor problems. There is no comparison between the Chinaman, even of the lowest coolie class, and the man who comes here from Southeastern Europe, from Russia, or from Southern Italy. The Chinese are thoroughly good workers. That is why the laborers here hate them. I think, too, that the emigration to America would help the Chinese. At least he would come into contact with some real Christian people in America. The Chinaman lives in squalor because he is poor. If he had some prosperity his squalor would cease.

The "Driving Out" period
Following the passing of the Chinese Exclusion Act, a period known as the "Driving Out" era was born. In this period, anti-Chinese Americans physically forced Chinese communities to flee to other areas. Large scale violence in Western states included the Rock Springs massacre (1885) and the Hells Canyon massacre (1887).

Rock Springs massacre of 1885

The massacre was named for the town where it took place, Rock Springs, Wyoming, in Sweetwater County, where white miners were jealous of the Chinese for their employment. White miners expressed their jealous frustration by robbing, bullying, shooting, and stabbing the Chinese in Chinatown. The Chinese tried to flee but many were burned alive in their homes, starved to death in hidden refuge, or exposed to carnivorous animal predators in the mountains. Some were rescued by a passing train, but by the end of the event at least twenty-eight lives had been taken. In an attempt to appease the situation, the government intervened by sending federal troops to protect the Chinese. However, only compensations for destroyed property were paid. No one was arrested nor held accountable for the atrocities committed during the riot.

Hells Canyon massacre of 1887

The massacre was named for the location where it took place, along the Snake River in Hells Canyon near the mouth of Deep Creek. The area contained many rocky cliffs and white rapids that together posed significant danger to human safety. 34 Chinese miners were killed at the site. The miners were employed by the Sam Yup company, one of the six largest Chinese companies at the time, which worked in this area since October 1886. The actual events are still unclear due to unreliable law enforcement at the time, biased news reporting, and lack of serious official investigations. However, it is speculated that the dead Chinese miners were not victims of natural causes, but rather victims of gun shot wounds during a robbery committed by a gang of seven armed horse thieves. Gold worth $4,000–$5,000 was thought to have been stolen from the miners. The gold was never recovered nor further investigated.

The aftermath
Shortly following the incident, the Sam Yup company of San Francisco hired Lee Loi who later hired Joseph K. Vincent, then U.S. Commissioner, to lead an investigation. Vincent submitted his investigative report to the Chinese consulate who tried unsuccessfully to obtain justice for the Chinese miners. At around the same time, other compensation reports were also unsuccessfully filed for earlier crimes inflicted on the Chinese. In the end, on October 19, 1888, Congress agreed to greatly under-compensate for the massacre and ignore the claims for the earlier crimes. Even though the amount was greatly underpaid, it was still a small victory to the Chinese who had low expectations for relief or acknowledgement.

Issues of the act
The Chinese Exclusion Act lasted for about thirty years, and it caused the American economy to suffer a great loss. Some sources cite the act as a sign of injustice and unfair treatment to the Chinese workers because their jobs were mostly menial.

Impact on education in the U.S.
Recruitment of foreign students to U.S. colleges and universities was an important component in the expansion of American influence. International education programs allowed students to learn from the examples provided at elite universities and to bring their newfound skill sets back to their home countries. As such, international education has historically been seen as a vehicle for improving diplomatic relations and promoting trade. The US Exclusion Act, however, forced Chinese students attempting to enter the country to provide proof that they were not trying to bypass regulations. Laws and regulations that stemmed from the act made for less than ideal situations for Chinese students, leading to criticisms of American society. Policies and attitudes toward Chinese Americans in the US worked against foreign policy interests by limiting the ability of the U.S. to participate in international education initiatives.

Repeal and status
The Chinese Exclusion Act was repealed by the 1943 Magnuson Act when China had become an ally of the U.S. against Japan in World War II, as the U.S. needed to embody an image of fairness and justice. The Magnuson Act permitted Chinese nationals already residing in the country to become naturalized citizens and stop hiding from the threat of deportation. The act also allowed Chinese people to send remittances to people of Chinese descent living in mainland China, Macao, Hong Kong, and Taiwan and other countries or territories, especially if the funding is not tied to criminal activity. However, the Magnuson Act only allowed a national quota of 105 Chinese immigrants per year and did not repeal the restrictions on immigration from the other Asian countries. The crackdown on Chinese immigrants reached a new level in its last decade, from 1956 to 1965, with the Chinese Confession Program launched by the Immigration and Naturalization Service, that encouraged Chinese who had committed immigration fraud to confess, so as to be eligible for some leniency in treatment. Large-scale Chinese immigration did not occur until the passage of the Immigration and Nationality Act of 1965.

The first Chinese immigrants who entered the United States under the Magnuson Act were college students who sought to escape the warfare in China during World War II and study in the U.S. The establishment of the People's Republic of China and its entry into the Korean War against the U.S., however, created a new threat in the minds of some American politicians: American-educated Chinese students bringing American knowledge back to "Red China". Many Chinese college students were almost forcibly naturalized, even though they continued to face significant prejudice, discrimination, and bullying. One of the most prolific of these students was Tsou Tang, who would go on to become the leading expert on China and Sino-American relations during the Cold War.

Although the Chinese Exclusion Act was repealed in 1943, the law in California prohibiting non-whites from marrying whites was not struck down until 1948, in which the California Supreme Court ruled the ban of interracial marriage within the state unconstitutional in Perez v. Sharp. Some other states had such laws until 1967, when the U.S. Supreme Court unanimously ruled in Loving v. Virginia that anti-miscegenation laws across the nation are unconstitutional.

Even today, although all its constituent sections have long been repealed, Chapter 7 of Title 8 of the United States Code is headed "Exclusion of Chinese". It is the only chapter of the 15 chapters in Title 8 (Aliens and Nationality) that is completely focused on a specific nationality or ethnic group. Like the following Chapter 8, "The Cooly Trade", it consists entirely of statutes that are noted as "Repealed" or "Omitted".

On June 18, 2012, the U.S. House of Representatives passed , a resolution introduced by Congresswoman Judy Chu which formally expresses the regret of the House of Representatives for the Chinese Exclusion Act. , a similar resolution, had been approved by the U.S. Senate in October 2011.

In 2014, the California Legislature took formal action to pass measures that formally recognize the accomplishments of Chinese Americans in California and to call upon Congress to formally apologize for the 1882 adoption of the Chinese Exclusion Act. Senate Republican leader Bob Huff (R-Diamond Bar) and incoming Senate president pro-Tem Kevin de León (D-Los Angeles) served as joint authors for Senate Joint Resolution (SJR) 23 and Senate Concurrent Resolution (SCR) 122, respectively.

Both SJR 23 and SCR 122 acknowledge and celebrate the history and contributions of Chinese Americans in California. The resolutions also formally call on Congress to apologize for laws that resulted in the persecution of Chinese Americans, such as the Chinese Exclusion Act.

Perhaps most important are the sociological implications for understanding ethnic/race relations in the context of American history; minorities tend to be punished in times of economic, political, and/or geopolitical crises. Times of social and systemic stability, however, tend to mute any underlying tensions between different groups. In times of societal crisis—whether perceived or real—patterns of retractability of American identities have erupted to the forefront of America's political landscape, often generating institutional and civil society backlash against workers from other nations, a pattern documented by Fong's research into how crises drastically alter social relationships.

See also
 Anti-Chinese legislation in the United States
 Chinese Confession Program
 The Chinese Exclusion Act, a 2018 television documentary film from PBS
 Anti-Chinese sentiment
 Los Angeles Chinese massacre of 1871
 Lau Ow Bew v. United States, which held that returning merchants did not need paperwork from China.
 List of United States immigration laws
 Naturalization Act of 1798
 Paper sons
 Rock Springs massacre
 United States v. Wong Kim Ark, which held that the Chinese Exclusion Act could not overrule the citizenship of those born in the U.S. to Chinese parents
 Yellow Peril
 Chinese Immigration Act, 1885, Canada
 Chinese Americans

References

Further reading

 

 alternative link at Hathitrust

Primary sources

Chinese Immigration Pamphlets in the California State Library. Vol. 1 | Vol. 2 | Vol. 3 | Vol. 4,
"Bitter Melon: Inside America's Last Rural Chinese Town" How residents of Locke, California, the last rural Chinese town in America, lived in the Sacramento Delta under the Chinese Exclusion Act

External links

George Frederick Seward and the Chinese Exclusion Act | "From the Stacks" at New-York Historical Society
George Frederick Seward Papers, MS 557, The New-York Historical Society
Chinese Exclusion Act from the Library of Congress
Chinese Exclusion Act – Menlo School
Chinese Exclusion Act (1882) – Our Documents
Exclusion Act Case Files of Yee Wee Thing and Yee Bing Quai, two "Paper Sons"
The Yung Wing Project hosts the memoir of one of the earliest naturalized Chinese whose citizenship was revoked forty-six years after having received it as a result of the Chinese Exclusion Act.
An Alleged Wife One Immigrant in the Chinese Exclusion Era
Collection of primary source documents relating to the Chinese Exclusion Act, from Harvard University.
Primary source documents and images from the University of California 
The Rocky Road to Liberty: A Documented History of Chinese American Immigration and Exclusion
Primary source documents and images related to the documentary "Separate Lives, Broken Dreams", a saga of the Chinese Exclusion Act era, e.g. political cartoons, immigrant case files and government correspondence from the National Archives.

Li Bo. Beyond the Heavenly Kingdom is a historical novel that focuses on the politics of the Chinese Exclusion Act 
Lost Years: A People's Struggle for Justice (2011)

Frederick A. Bee History Project

1882 in international relations
1882 in American law
1882 in the United States
Anti-Chinese legislation
Anti-Chinese sentiment in the United States
Anti-immigration politics in the United States
Asian-American issues
Chinese-American history
History of immigration to the United States
History of racial segregation in the United States
Race and law in the United States
Race legislation in the United States
United States federal immigration and nationality legislation
United States immigration and naturalization case law
Repealed United States legislation
Immigration bans